"Who Drinks My Beer When I'm Gone" is a single by Canadian country music group Mercey Brothers. The song debuted at number 36 on the RPM Country Tracks chart on March 17, 1969. It peaked at number 1 on June 9, 1969.

Chart performance

References

1969 singles
Mercey Brothers songs
1969 songs
Columbia Records singles
Song articles with missing songwriters